Ringing in the Sane is the debut studio album and third release from Australian rock band The Hot Lies, released through Liberation Music on 15 September 2007. Two singles were released to radio from the album, "Emergency! Emergency!" and "Tokyo".

Track listing

Charts

Personnel
Peter Wood - Vocals
Benjamin Pix - Guitar, backing vocals
Luke Szabo - Guitar
Leaton Rose - Bass, backing vocals
Jared Brown - Drums
Phil McKellar - Producer

References

2007 albums
The Hot Lies albums